The Closed Mouth (Italian:La bocca chiusa) is a 1925 Italian silent film directed by Guglielmo Zorzi.

Cast
 Maria Jacobini as Maria  
 Arnold Kent as Lord Colchester, padre e figlio  
 Carlo Benetti as Marchese di Castelfino  
 Carmen Boni as Jolanda  
 Augusto Poggioli as Il padrigo di Maria 
 Pina Marini 
 Marcella Sabbatini

References

Bibliography
 Vacche, Angela Dalle. Diva: Defiance and Passion in Early Italian Cinema. University of Texas Press, 2008.

External links

1925 films
1920s Italian-language films
Films directed by Guglielmo Zorzi
Italian silent feature films
Italian black-and-white films